The Steel City Derby (also known as the Sheffield Derby) is a local derby that takes place between Sheffield United and Sheffield Wednesday, the two professional football league teams based in the city of Sheffield, England. It is widely considered to be one of the biggest derby matches in English football.

The teams have met a total of 131 times in competitive games, with United winning 46 games and Wednesday winning 42. The most recent Steel City Derby was played at Hillsborough on 4 March 2019, which ended in a goalless draw.

History
The teams first met on 15 December 1890 at Wednesday's Olive Grove ground, with The Wednesday playing a friendly match against the newly formed Sheffield United that the home team won 2–1.

The first competitive Steel City Derby fixture took place on 16 October 1893 during the 1893–94 English First Division season (following United's promotion to the First Division the previous season), it ended 1–1.

Most Steel City derbies have taken place in the top two tiers of English football, with only two seasons (1979–80 and 2011–12) featuring both teams in the third tier.

Alan Quinn became the first player to score a goal for both clubs in a Steel City derby match. He scored for Sheffield Wednesday in their 3-1 defeat to United at Bramall Lane in February 2003. He signed to United from Wednesday in 2004 and scored the winning goal for Sheffield United in a 1-0 win over Sheffield Wednesday at Bramall Lane on 4 December 2005.

Games played since 2007

2007–08 Championship
The first of the two league games for the 2007–08 Championship season was at Hillsborough on 19 January 2008 in front of a crowd of 30,486; Wednesday won 2–0 with goals from Akpo Sodje and Marcus Tudgay. The return fixture at Bramall Lane on 8 April 2008 and saw United recover from 2–0 down to draw 2–2 in front of 31,760 fans.

2008–09 Championship
The first meeting of the two matches for the following season, the 2008–09 Championship was held on 19 October 2008, at Hillsborough with a crowd of 30,441. Wednesday won 1–0 with a 35th minute volley from Steve Watson. This game also had a missed penalty by Deon Burton (saved by Paddy Kenny), and two red cards, Matthew Kilgallon got sent off for United before the goal and Jermaine Johnson got sent off for Wednesday midway through the second half after being substituted. The return game at Bramall Lane was on 7 February 2009, with Wednesday winning 2–1 thanks to goals from Tommy Spurr and Marcus Tudgay. This victory was Wednesday's first at Bramall Lane since 1967 and the first "double" over their city rivals for 95 years.

2009–10 Championship
On 18 September 2009 Sheffield United took a 3–0 lead against Sheffield Wednesday into half time, but two Owls goals in the second half allowed Wednesday back in. But the score finished 3–2 to United and earned Kevin Blackwell his first win against Sheffield Wednesday since joining the club. The 125th Steel City Derby played on 18 April at Hillsborough was drawn 1–1. Wednesday took the lead late in the first half from a Darren Potter volley, United equalized on the hour mark through a Lee Williamson shot.

2011–12 League One
On the first derby game of the season on 16 October 2011 United gained a 2–0 lead, but with six minutes remaining, Wednesday came back to draw 2–2 with a goal from Chris O'Grady and an injury time equaliser from strike partner Gary Madine at Bramall Lane. The second game on 26 February 2012, at Hillsborough was important for both teams, since both sides were competing for promotion to the Championship. Wednesday took the full three points with a 1–0 win after a goal from Chris O'Grady. The goal turned out to be crucial, since Wednesday eventually finished second in the table and gained promotion with 93 points, while United finished third with 90 points. United eventually failed to gain promotion after losing the Play-off final at Wembley to Huddersfield Town in a penalty shootout. After a six-year exile, United finally achieved promotion to the Championship in May 2017.

2017–18 Championship
The first 2017-18 Steel City Derby was played at Hillsborough on Sunday 24 September 2017 (kicked off at 1:15 pm GMT), which ended in a 4-2 victory for United in front of a crowd of 32,839. Goals for United came from John Fleck in the 3rd minute, Mark Duffy in the 67th minute, and two (in the 15th and 77th minute respectively) from Leon Clarke against his former side, with Gary Hooper in the 47th minute (scored in the first half as two minutes were added on) and Lucas Joao (65') scoring for Wednesday. This game was nicknamed the 'Bouncing Day Massacre' by the United fans, due to a chant by the Wednesday fans following Joao's goal that ended abruptly as a result of Mark Duffy's goal shortly afterwards.

The return fixture at Bramall Lane took place on Friday 12 January 2018 and ended in a goalless draw, the first since January 2002.

2018-19 Championship
The first match was hosted by Sheffield United at Bramall Lane on Friday 9 November 2018, kicking off at 7:45 pm after a minutes' silence for Remembrance Day. Sky Sports, who televised the match, were later criticised and branded "disrespectful" for playing canned crowd noise over the performance of the Last Post which was observed in silence by the crowd. Just 14 minutes into the game, Sheffield United's Mark Duffy was fouled by Sheffield Wednesday's Morgan Fox and was awarded a penalty, taken by David McGoldrick and saved by Cameron Dawson. The match ended 0–0.

The return fixture was played at Hillsborough on 4 March 2019 and also ended 0–0.

Summary of all competitive matches
 
Eligible competitions – Football League, Premier League, FA Cup, Football League Cup, Full Members' CupAs of 1 February 2018

Statistics obtained from soccerbase.com *except for the Full Members Cup result This table excludes pre-season games, regional war-time leagues, friendlies and testimonials (see below)

Matches played

Non-competitive matches

Famous matches 
The most famous match at Bramall Lane was on 8 September 1951, an encounter United won 7–3 in front of a crowd of 51,075. Wednesday scored after just ninety seconds through Thomas, but goals from Derek Hawksworth and Harold Brook gave United a 2–1 interval lead which would have been greater if McIntosh in the Wednesday goal had not saved a Fred Furniss penalty. Dennis Woodhead equalised for Wednesday after sixty minutes, but in rapid succession, Alf Ringstead, Hawksworth and Ringstead again, and Fred Smith scored for United, Woodhead pulled one back for Wednesday before Brook made the score 7–3.

The "Boxing Day Massacre" was a match played on 26 December 1979. Sheffield Wednesday won 4–0, with goals from Ian Mellor, Terry Curran, Mark Smith and Jeff King. The United side at the time were top of the league, while Wednesday were 4th in the table. Sheffield Wednesday were promoted at the end of the season.

On 3 April 1993, the two teams met in the FA Cup semi-finals. The game was scheduled to be played at Elland Road while the other semi between Arsenal and Tottenham Hotspur was to be played at Wembley. However The Football Association was forced to move the fixture to Wembley due to extreme pressure from the fans of both teams. The match itself proved to be a classic, with Wednesday winning 2–1 after extra-time. Chris Waddle and Mark Bright scoring for Wednesday, and Alan Cork scoring for United. The match was watched by 75,364 spectators.

Resurgence in the Steel City Derby
After Sheffield Wednesday's relegation from the Premier League after the 1999–2000 season both teams frequented the same league for seven of the next ten years. This caused the local rivalry between the two teams to increase and to cause an emergence of crowd trouble in 2003 2008 and 2019

Before the 2000–01 season both teams were only in the same league for six seasons between 1970–71 and 1999–00 (twenty-nine seasons), although this period did see one FA Cup semi-final meeting in 1993 and a Zenith Data Cup (Full Members Cup) meeting in 1989.

Off-pitch relationship
Supporters of the two Sheffield clubs have a fierce but healthy relationship. This goes right back to 1889 after Sheffield Wednesday, formed in 1867, had vacated Bramall Lane due to a dispute over rent. To compensate for the loss in revenue, the Cricket committee took the decision to form another football club, thus Sheffield United were established and Bramall Lane subsequently became their home.

The Clubs themselves do appear to have an amicable relationship, and on 15 July 2011 both Sheffield United and Sheffield Wednesday held a joint conference called "Supporting Sheffield" in which they announced a joint shirt sponsorship deal with two local Sheffield based companies for the 2011-12 League One season. The two local sponsors were Westfield Health (a Not for Profit healthcare organisation), who were the home kit sponsor for the Blades and the away kit sponsor for the Owls, and the Gilder Group (a Volkswagen car dealer), who were the away kit sponsor for the Blades and the home kit sponsor for the Owls. United and Wednesday both made a six figure sum from the sponsorship deal. The deal was the first of its kind in English football with The Telegraph likening the deal to Glasgow rivals and neighbours Celtic and Rangers who have frequently shared shirt sponsors in the past.

Played for both
Played for both:

 Earl Barrett
 Danny Batth
 Carl Bradshaw
 Leigh Bromby
 Franz Carr
 Leon Clarke
 Richard Cresswell
 Terry Curran
 David Ford
 Derek Geary
 Paul Heald
 Ben Heneghan 
 David Johnson
 Marvin Johnson 
 Caolan Lavery
 Gary Madine
 Brian Marwood
 David McGoldrick
 Jon-Paul McGovern
 Tony McMahon
 Nathaniel Mendez-Laing 
 Owen Morrison
 Joe Mattock
 Chris O'Grady
 Alan Quinn
 Neil Ramsbottom
 Carl Robinson
 Wilf Rostron
 Bernard Shaw
 Simon Stainrod
 Keith Treacy
 Imre Varadi
 Alan Warboys
 Dean Windass

Scored in derby for both:

 Alan Quinn

Managed both teams:
 Danny Wilson
 Steve Bruce

Played for one, managed the other:
 Nigel Clough
 Teddy Davison
 Ian Porterfield
 Paul Heckingbottom

Played for one, coached the other:
 Sam Ellis
 Phil Henson
 James Beattie
 Mike Trusson
 Alan Hodgkinson

Coached both teams:
 Frank Barlow
 Danny Bergara
 Willie Donachie
 Adam Owen

Other connections:
 Derek Dooley, played for and managed Wednesday and was then had a variety of roles at United including Commercial Manager, Managing Director, Chairman and Vice President
 John Harris, managed United and scouted for Wednesday

Honours

Notes and references

External links 
 Steel City Derby FootballDerbies.com
 Steel City Derby BBC South Yorkshire (archived 18 January 2008)

Sport in Sheffield
Sheffield United F.C.
Sheffield Wednesday F.C.
England football derbies